SLIMS may refer to:

St. Louis, Iron Mountain and Southern Railway
Sierra Leone International Mission School